Paradrillia nivalioides is a species of sea snail, a marine gastropod mollusk in the family Horaiclavidae.

Description

Distribution
This marine species occurs off Japan. Fossils have also been found in Pliocene strata in Japan.

References

 Yokoyama, Matajiro. "Fossils from the Miura Peninsula and its immediate north." (1920); repository.dl.itc.u-tokyo.ac.jp
 Higo, S., Callomon, P. & Goto, Y. (1999). Catalogue and bibliography of the marine shell-bearing Mollusca of Japan. Osaka. : Elle Scientific Publications. 749 pp.
 Powell, A.W.B. (1969). The Family Turridae in the Indo-Pacific. Part. 2. The subfamily Turriculinae . Indo-Pacific Mollusca. 2 : 215–415, pls 188–324

nivalioides
Gastropods described in 1920